Long Park is a locality in the Riverina district of New South Wales, Australia. It was the site of a now-closed railway station between 1910 and 1975 on the Oaklands railway line. The railway remains open; however the siding and station have been removed and little trace remains.

References

Towns in the Riverina
Towns in New South Wales